Luca Manelli (circa 1265 - 1362) was an Italian classicist and archbishop.

Biography
He was born in Florence to a prominent family. He joined the Dominican order circa 1280. His erudition brought him into the circle of Pope Clement VI in Avignon. There he published some of the epistles of Seneca and wrote a treatise on moral philosophy. He was appointed as bishop of Osimo in 1347, and later Fano in 1358, where he died.

References

External links
 
 

1265 births
1364 deaths
14th-century Italian writers
Italian bishops